Ralph Wammack (February 14, 1867 - April 11, 1945) was an American politician from Bloomfield, Missouri, who served in the Missouri Senate.  He served as Stoddard County prosecuting attorney from 1893 until 1897.  Wammack was educated in Bloomfield public school system.

References

1867 births
1945 deaths
Democratic Party Missouri state senators
People from Bloomfield, Missouri